Malbun is a ski-resort village in an exclave of the  municipality of Triesenberg, in Liechtenstein.

Geography
Malbun is the only resort for skiing in Liechtenstein. In 1968, five Swiss artillery shells accidentally hit it, damaging a few chairs that were sitting outdoors.

Bergbahnen Malbun

Bergbahnen Malbun is the actual ski area of Malbun village and is serviced by three chair lifts: two on the western slope area and one on the eastern slope area. At the top of Bergbahn Malbun's eastern lift, the alpine ridges of Switzerland and Austria can be seen. At the slope area's base are two children's areas. Malbi Park is the learning area for children that is provided at no cost and includes a miniature tow-bar as well as a magic carpet. The other area is primarily the location of Malbun's ski school instruction and is located a short distance further from the main ski area.

References

External links
Liechtenstein - The Snowboard Dad In Europe

Villages of Liechtenstein
Ski areas and resorts in Liechtenstein
Enclaves and exclaves